Inkaar may refer to:
 Inkaar (1943 film), starring Jagdish Sethi
 Inkaar (1977 film), produced by Raj Sippy and directed by Romu Sippy, starring Vinod Khanna and Vidya Sinha
 Inkaar (2013 film), produced by Prakash Jha and directed by Sudhir Mishra, starring Arjun Rampal and Chitrangada Singh
 Inkaar (2019 TV series), produced by Momina Duraid, starring Yumna Zaidi, Imran Ashraf and Sami Khan